, also known as TOKYO OVAL KEIOKAKU, is a velodrome located in Chōfu, Tokyo that conducts pari-mutuel Keirin racing - one of Japan's four authorized  where gambling is permitted. Its Keirin identification number for betting purposes is 27# (27 sharp).

Keiokaku's oval is 400 meters in circumference. A typical keirin race of 2,025 meters consists of five laps around the course.

External links
TOKYO OVAL KEIOKAKU Home Page (Japanese)
keirin.jp Keiokaku Information (Japanese)

Velodromes in Japan
Sports venues in Tokyo
Cycle racing in Japan
Chōfu, Tokyo